Leo Halavatau (born 21 November 1983) is a Tongan rugby union player.

Leo joined the Sunbry-based Aviva Premiership outfit from the former Championship side Birmingham & Solihull for the start of the 2011/12 season.  He made his debut for the club, coming off the bench to replace Faan Rautenbach in the London Double Header fixture against Harlequins at the start of that season, before earning his first start the following week against Sale Sharks.  Leo went on to make 11 appearances for the club in his first season, and November 2012 signed a 3-year contract extension, keeping him at the club until the end of the 2015/16 season.

With injuries to fellow tightheads during the 2013/14 season Halavatau has featured in all but one of the exiles matchday squads, earning plaudits for both his workrate around the park and his scrummaging.
Leo has had experiences with playing back row. He made his 100th appearance for London Irish in December 2015. He was released by London Irish in 2016.

In 2021 he moved to Chatres Rugby. In March 2022 he signed a one-year contract extension.

References

External links
London Irish Profile

1983 births
Living people
London Irish players
Tongan rugby union players
Tonga international rugby union players
Rugby union props
Expatriate rugby union players in France
Expatriate rugby union players in England
Tongan expatriate rugby union players
Tongan expatriate sportspeople in France
Tongan expatriate sportspeople in England
Soyaux Angoulême XV Charente players